The Invisible Edge is a 2009 business book written by authors Mark Blaxill and Ralph Eckardt that focuses on the unappreciated value of intellectual property and how it can be harnessed by firms to create sustainable advantages.

References

Business books
2009 non-fiction books